KFLO-LP (102.9 FM) is a radio station licensed to serve Jonesboro, Arkansas.  The station is owned by American Heritage Media Inc. It airs an Oldies format.

The station was assigned the KFLO-LP call letters by the Federal Communications Commission on January 10, 2003.

References

External links

http://www.kflo.org
KFLO-LP service area per the FCC database

FLO-LP
FLO-LP
Craighead County, Arkansas
Radio stations established in 2003